The 1987–88 Michigan State Spartans men's basketball team represented Michigan State University in the 1987–88 NCAA Division I men's basketball season. The team played their home games at Jenison Field House in East Lansing, Michigan and were members of the Big Ten Conference. They were coached by Jud Heathcote in his 12th year at Michigan State. The Spartans finished with an overall record of 10–18, 5–13 to finish in eighth place in Big Ten play.

Previous season
The Spartans finished the 1987–88 season with an overall record of 11–17, 6–12 to finish in seventh place in Big Ten play.

Roster and statistics 

Source

Schedule and results

|-
!colspan=9 style=| Non-conference regular season

|-
!colspan=9 style=| Big Ten regular season

References

Michigan State Spartans men's basketball seasons
Michigan State
Michigan State Spartans men's b
Michigan State Spartans men's b